The Radio Yerevan jokes, also known as the Armenian Radio jokes, have been popular in the Soviet Union and other countries of the former Communist Eastern bloc since the second half of the 20th century. These jokes of the Q&A type pretended to come from the Question & Answer series of the Armenian Radio. A typical format of a joke was: "Radio Yerevan was asked," and "Radio Yerevan answered."

Examples of jokes
Examples of Radio Yerevan jokes include:

 Radio Yerevan was asked: "Is it true that there is freedom of speech in the USSR (in some versions, Russia), just like in the USA?"
Radio Yerevan answered: "In principle, yes. In the USA, you can stand in front of the White House and yell, “Down with Reagan!”, and you will not be punished. Equally, you can also stand in the Red Square in Moscow and yell, “Down with Reagan!”, and you will not be punished."

 Radio Yerevan was asked: "Could an atomic bomb destroy our beloved town, Yerevan, with its splendid buildings and beautiful gardens?"
Radio Yerevan answered: "In principle, yes. But Moscow is by far a more beautiful city."

Since the fall of communism

After the perestroika period, and the final dissolution of the USSR in 1991, new Radio Yerevan jokes became rare, as Russians felt freer to engage in more conventional forms of political protest and satire. 

 Radio Yerevan was asked: "Does Radio Yerevan still accept questions from the listening public?"
Radio Yerevan answered: "No. The Jew who wrote the answers died (variant: left for Israel)."

With the rise of Vladimir Putin and increasing authoritarianism under his rule, new jokes in the Radio Yerevan format became popular, distributed on the Internet as much as orally. Putin, other prominent Russians, and the Russian economy are the most common targets, but with greater availability of news from abroad, Western current affairs are also alluded to.

 Radio Yerevan was asked: "How does Putin's Russia differ from Soviet Russia?"
Radio Yerevan answered: "The Communist Party of the Soviet Union can be thought of as a corporation that owned everything. Vladimir Putin is more like a sole proprietor."

 Radio Yerevan was asked: "Speaking on RT, President Putin supported the toughening of penalties for corruption. Are you comfortable discussing measures that you believe should be applied to corrupt officials?"
Radio Yerevan answered: "Yes, we feel comfortable discussing such measures. The most blatantly corrupt officials should be banned from appearing in music videos."

 Radio Yerevan was asked: "Why did President Putin help Mother Russia off her knees?"
Radio Yerevan answered: "He wanted to screw her in a different position."

 Radio Yerevan was asked: "Russia is often called a petrostate. What is the difference between a petrostate and a banana republic?"
Radio Yerevan answered: "Bananas are a renewable resource."

 Radio Yerevan was asked: "Is there any way Hillary Clinton could still enter the White House?"
Radio Yerevan answered: "In principle, yes. She could divorce Bill and marry Donald Trump."

 Radio Yerevan was asked: "Why did the Greeks want to flee the eurozone?"
Radio Yerevan answered: "Eurozone, Soviet zone, exclusion zone---a zone is a zone, no matter what you call it." (Zone also means "prison" in colloquial Russian).

During the 2014 Crimean crisis 
Another joke was told about Finland during the crisis in Ukraine:

"How many Russian compatriots live in Finland?" asks the listener
"Enough," the radio replies, "so that a referendum can be held."

See also
 Public Radio of Armenia
 Russian jokes
 East German jokes

References

Joke cycles
Russian humour
Soviet culture